This is a list of assets owned by Shaw Communications.

Approximately 80% of the voting control in Shaw Communications is held by the family of founder JR Shaw. The same family also owns about 80% of the voting rights in Corus Entertainment, and hence also exercises control over the media holdings of the Shaw family, in addition to the properties listed here.

Telecommunications
 Shaw Cable — Cable television operator serving most of British Columbia (except the Sunshine Coast Regional District), Alberta (except Grande Prairie), and Manitoba (except Brandon and Winkler), as well as portions of Saskatchewan (Saskatoon area) and Ontario (Thunder Bay, Sault Ste. Marie, and Kenora).
 Shaw Broadcast Services —  television and radio signal distributor
 Shaw Business Solutions
 Shaw Direct — national direct-broadcast satellite television provider
 Freedom Mobile — mobile network operator serving urban areas of British Columbia, Alberta, and Ontario
Shaw Mobile — mobile network operator serving Alberta and British Columbia

Specialty and community channels
 Cable Public Affairs Channel (23.68%)
 Shaw Multicultural Channel
 Shaw Spotlight

Other assets
 BlueCurve TV App
Shaw PPV
Shaw Rocket Fund — organization providing funding for youth-oriented television series.
 Shaw Tracking — fleet management

Former assets
 Shaw Media — sold to Corus Entertainment in 2016.
 Shomi — video streaming service co-owned with Rogers Communications, shut down in 2016.
 CJBN-TV (Kenora, Ontario) — Global TV affiliate operated by Shaw Cable, shut down in 2017.
 ViaWest, Inc. — cloud computing and storage services, data management services, and network security services.

See also
List of assets owned by Corus Entertainment

References

Shaw Communications
Shaw Communications
Shaw Communications